A canonical unit is a unit of measurement agreed upon as default in a certain context.

In astrodynamics 
In astrodynamics, canonical units are defined in terms of some important object’s orbit that serves as a reference. In this system, a reference mass, for example the Sun’s, is designated as 1 “canonical mass unit” and the mean distance from the orbiting object to the reference object is considered the “canonical distance unit”.

Canonical units are useful when the precise distances and masses of objects in space are not available. Moreover, by designating the mass of some chosen central or primary object to be “1 canonical mass unit” and the mean distance of the reference object to another object in question to be “1 canonical distance unit”, many calculations can be simplified.

Overview 
The Canonical Distance Unit  is defined to be the mean radius of the reference orbit.

The Canonical Time Unit  is defined by the gravitational parameter :

where
 is the gravitational constant
 is the mass of the central reference body

In canonical units, the gravitational parameter is given by:

Any triplet of numbers,   and  that satisfy the equation above is a “canonical” set.

The quantity of the time unit  can be solved in another unit system (e.g. the metric system) if the mass and radius of the central body have been determined. Using the above equation and applying dimensional analysis, set the two equations expressing  equal to each other:

The time unit can be converted to another unit system for a more useful qualitative solution using the following equation:

For Earth-orbiting satellites, approximate unit conversions are as follows:
 1  = 6378.1 km = 20,925,524.97 ft
 1  = 7.90538 km/s = 25,936.29 ft/sec
 1  = 806.80415 s

Astronomical Unit 
The astronomical unit is the canonical distance unit for the orbit around the Sun of the combined Earth-Moon system (based on the formerly best-known value). The corresponding time unit is the (sidereal) year)), and the mass is the total mass of the Sun.

See also 
Astronomical unit
Conversion of units

Footnotes

References 

 

Astrodynamics
Celestial mechanics